Penmoken Park is a neighborhood in southwestern Lexington, Kentucky, United States. It is composed of a single street - Penmoken Park. It is bounded by Rosemont Garden to the north, Nicholasville Road to the east, and the Norfolk Southern railroad tracks to the west.

Neighborhood statistics
 Area: 
 Population: 111
 Population density: 3,521 people per square mile
 Median household income: $54,581

External links
 http://www.city-data.com/neighborhood/Penmoken-Park-Lexington-KY.html

Neighborhoods in Lexington, Kentucky